Myeongnyun Station is a station of Busan Metro Line 1 in Myeongnyun-dong, Dongnae District, Busan, South Korea.

Station Layout

Gallery

External links

  Cyber station information from Busan Transportation Corporation

Busan Metro stations
Dongnae District
Railway stations in South Korea opened in 1985